World View Multicultural was a Canadian regional premium television service based in British Columbia licensed by the CRTC in 1982.

World View Multicultural was launched on February 1, 1983 like the rest of the Canadian pay-TV channels.

In August 1985, World View Multicultural was acquired by Cathay International Television and subsequently the channels license was amended to provide 96% of programming in Chinese and 4% in English.

Ownership 
90% was owned by a company controlled by Frank Zimmer and George Spracklin.

They held $15.8 million in equity at the time of license.

They promised to spend $46.3 million on Canadian content over 5 years (1983–88), and would make a $6.4 million profit by 1988.

Management 
 Justine Bizzocchi, programming director

Programming 

Besides movies, programming on AIM/World View included Italian soccer, sumo wrestling, and the Asian Games in New Delhi.

It broadcast a total of 90 hours per week in several languages: English, French, German, Swedish, Danish, Norwegian, Finnish, Icelandic, Japanese, Chinese, Italian, Hindi, Punjabi, and Urdu.

Pricing 

The wholesale price would be $7/month.

References

Defunct television networks in Canada
Television channels and stations established in 1983
Television channels and stations disestablished in 1984
1983 establishments in British Columbia
1984 disestablishments in British Columbia